Congress of People's Deputies:
 Congress of Soviets of Workers', Soldiers' and Peasants' Deputies, sometimes shortened as Congress of People's Deputies
 Congress of People's Deputies of the Soviet Union
 Congress of People's Deputies of Russia
 Congress of People's Deputies (Russia, 2022)
 Congress of People's Deputies of the Dagestan Autonomous Soviet Socialist Republic

See also 
 Congress of Deputies (disambiguation)